Annette Michelson (November 7, 1922 – September 17, 2018) was an American art and film critic and writer. Her work contributed to the fields of cinema studies and the avant-garde in visual culture.

Biography
Born in 1922, Michelson graduated from Hunter College High School circa 1940 and  Brooklyn College in 1948.  Between 1956 and 1966, she was art editor and critic for the Paris edition of the New York Herald Tribune while also writing for Arts Magazine and Art International.  She worked as a writer for Artforum, where she edited the influential issues on 'Eisenstein/Brakhage' in 1973 and the 'Special Film Issue' in 1973. Together with Jay Leyda, she established the Department of Cinema Studies at New York University, where she taught numerous courses, supervised doctoral dissertations, and developed programs until retiring in 2004.

Leaving Artforum in 1976, she founded the journal October together with Rosalind Krauss. October was formed as a politically charged journal that introduced American readers to the ideas of French post-structuralism, made popular by Michel Foucault and Roland Barthes. Michelson's early essays for the journal included several on Sergei Eisenstein and Dziga Vertov, as well translations of texts by Georges Bataille. Krauss and Michelson remained on the journal's editorial board, along with Yve-Alain Bois, Hal Foster, Benjamin H. D. Buchloh, Denis Hollier, David Joselit, Carrie Lambert-Beatty, Mignon Nixon, and Malcolm Turvey.

In 1998, Michelson gave a historic lecture on Harry Everett Smith's film Heaven + Earth Magic (Film #12) at Massachusetts College of Art. A recording of the presentation was made by Saul Levine and is archived with Raymond Foye.

Among her numerous translations, essays and articles, Michelson edited Kino-Eye: the Writings of Dziga Vertov (1984), and Cinema, Censorship, and the State: The Writings of Nagisa Oshima (1992).

On August 10, 2015, the Getty Research Institute announced that Michelson had donated her complete papers and archives to the Institute. The GRI also acquired the drawing Blind Time (1982) and a suite of lithographs, Earth Projects (1969), both by Robert Morris, from Michelson’s collection, as well as Michelson’s film library of over 1500 selections.

Michelson published a collection of her works on avant-garde and experimental film as On the Eve of the Future: Selected Writings on Film (MIT Press) in 2017. The volume includes the first critical essay on Marcel Duchamp's film Anemic Cinema, the first investigation into Joseph Cornell's filmic practices, and the first major exploration of work by Michael Snow. It also includes important essays on Maya Deren, Stan Brakhage, and Hollis Frampton.

Michelson died from complications of dementia on September 17, 2018 at her home in the SoHo neighborhood of Manhattan.

References

External links 
 Annette Michelson Papers, 1961-2014 Finding Aid, Getty Research Institute, Los Angeles.

1922 births
2018 deaths
American art critics
Women art critics
New York Herald Tribune people
Brooklyn College alumni
American film critics
American women film critics
Deaths from dementia in New York (state)
Hunter College High School alumni
Tisch School of the Arts faculty
20th-century American women writers
21st-century American women writers
Writers from New York City